Coleophora schmidti is a moth of the family Coleophoridae. It is found in Spain. They are nocturnal.

References

schmidti
Moths of Europe
Moths described in 1960